Aitor Esteban Bravo (born 21 June 1962) is a Spanish jurist and politician who serves as Member of the Congress of Deputies since 2004. He is a member of the Basque Nationalist Party and serves as the party's Spokesperson in the Congress of Deputies since 2012.

Biography 
Esteban's mother is from the Province of Soria and his father is from the Province of Biscay. Esteban studied in the Corazón de María School of Bilbao and he studied baccalaureate in the Central High School of Bilbao. Later, he studied law in the University of Deusto. He supports the Basque independence but he also considers himself as very pragmatic.

Esteban holds a PhD in Law from the University of Deusto and has been a professor at the same university of the subjects of Constitutional Law and the Institutional System of the Basque Country, Administrative Law and Indigenous History and Culture of North America and Mesoamerica. He is also an expert in Native American Culture and a scholar of the native legislation.

He is married to Itxaso Atutxa, a high-ranking member of the Basque Nationalist Party. They have two children.

Political career 
Esteban joined the Basque Nationalist Party (PNV) at the age of 16 and in 1983 he was appointed Secretary of the youth branch of the PNV. Two years he was appointed representative of the PNV's General Assembly and in 1991 he was appointed Spokesperson and Secretary of the Presidency of the General Assembly of Biscay. From 1995 to 2003 he was the President (or Speaker) of the General Assembly of Biscay.

Esteban made the leap to national politics in 2004 when he was elected MP to the Congress of Deputies for Biscay in the 2004 general election. He was re-elected in the general elections of 2008, 2011, 2015, 2016 and 2019. In 2012 he was appointed Spokesperson of the Basque Group in Congress.

References

External links 
 

1962 births
Living people
University of Deusto alumni
Spanish jurists
Basque Nationalist Party politicians
Politicians from Bilbao
Members of the 10th Congress of Deputies (Spain)
Members of the 11th Congress of Deputies (Spain)
Members of the 12th Congress of Deputies (Spain)
Members of the 13th Congress of Deputies (Spain)
Members of the 14th Congress of Deputies (Spain)
Members of the 9th Congress of Deputies (Spain)
Members of the 8th Congress of Deputies (Spain)
Academic staff of the University of Deusto